Brendon Ryan Barrett (born August 5, 1986) is an American actor and acting coach.

Early life and career
He was born in Roseville, California, and he grew up in Folsom.

He co-starred in The Shadow Men, which it was premiered at Cannes Film Festival in 1997. He was also the voice of Casper the Friendly Ghost in Casper's Haunted Christmas, and he played Chris Carson, the best friend of Casper the Friendly Ghost in the 1997 film Casper: A Spirited Beginning. Brendon graduated from Folsom High School in 2004 and attended Sacramento State University where he graduated with a double major in Communications and Criminal Justice. From 2007 to 2010, Barrett taught monologue and television 1 lessons at John Robert Powers.

In November 1998, Barrett acted in the television film Logan's War: Bound by Honor. It premiered on CBS, starring Chuck Norris and Eddie Cibrian. In it Barrett plays a child who witnessed the murder his family.

Awards 
Brendon Barrett was nominated for a Young Artist award for Best Performance in a TV / Pilot / Mini-Series: Leading Young Actor for Logan's War: Bound By Honor (ABC).

Filmography

Film

Television

External links

References 

1986 births
Living people
People from Roseville, California
American male child actors
American male film actors
American male television actors
American male voice actors
American acting coaches
20th-century American male actors
21st-century American male actors